Helcystogramma hassenzanensis is a moth in the family Gelechiidae. It was described by Kyu-Tek Park and Ronald W. Hodges in 1995. It is known from China (Jiangxi, Sichuan) and Taiwan.

The length of the forewings is 6–7.5 mm. The forewings are uniform grey brown, with three well-developed scale tufts. The margin has several short yellowish streaks from beyond three-fourths the length the anterior margin to the tornus. The postmedian line is inconspicuous. The hindwings are grey.

References

Moths described in 1995
hassenzanensis
Moths of Asia
Moths of Taiwan